Cystiscidae is a taxonomic family of minute sea snails, marine gastropod mollusks or micromollusks.

Description 
The shell is minute to large, either white, uniformly colored, or patterned; the surface is smooth, sculptured, or axially costate; the spire is flat to immersed, or low to tall; the protoconch is paucispiral; the lip is thickened, smooth or denticulate; an external varix is present or absent; a siphonal notch is present or absent; a posterior notch is present or absent; the columella is multiplicate, internal whorls cystiscid or modified cystiscid type. Mantle cavity with monopectinate ctenidium and bipectinate osphradium. Proboscis pleurembolic; jaws absent; typical radular sac present.

Taxonomy
The family was erected by William Stimpson for a single included species based on unusual features of the head and radula. Subsequent authors included this group in the family Marginellidae.

Coan (1965) recognized this group as a subfamily, but he did not include such genera as Gibberula, Persicula, and Canalispira. Rule of priority of the ICZN require that the name Cystiscidae must be used, but this is unfortunate because the type specimen of the type species is lost, and that species is poorly known.

2005 taxonomy 
The family Cystiscidae consists of subfamilies (according to the Working Classification of the Gastropoda by Bouchet et al., 2005):
Canalispirinae Fedosov, Caballer & Bouchet, 2019
Cystiscinae Stimpson, 1865
Granulininae G.A. & H.K. Coovert, 1995
Persiculinae G.A. & H.K. Coovert, 1995
Plesiocystiscinae G.A. & H.K. Coovert, 1995
Reference for inclusion of Granulinae in Cystiscidae: Bouchet, P.; Rocroi, J.-P.; Fryda, J.; Hausdorf, B.; Ponder, W.; Valdes, A.; Waren, A.  2005.  Classification and Nomenclator of Gastropod Families. Malacologia:  International Journal of Malacology.  Hackenheim, Germany: ConchBooks.

Genera 
Genera within the family Cystiscidae include:

Canalispirinae
Canalispira Jousseaume, 1875:168,270
Osvaldoginella Espinosa & Ortea, 1997

Cystiscinae
†Topaginella Laseron, 1957:288
Crithe Gould, 1860
Cystiscus Stimpson, 1865:55
Extra Jousseaume, 1894 - with the only species Extra extra Jousseaume, 1894
Gibberula Swainson, 1840
Inbiocystiscus Ortea and Espinosa, 2001
Intelcystiscus Ortea and Espinosa, 2001
†Marginocystiscus Landau, C. M. Silva & Heitz, 2016 
Pachybathron Gaskoin, 1853
Persicula Schumacher, 1817
Ticocystiscus Espinosa and Ortea, 2002
Ticofurcilla Espinosa & Ortea, 2002
Synonyms
Furcilla Espinosa & Ortea, 2000: synonym of Ticofurcilla Espinosa & Ortea, 2002 (Invalid: junior homonym of Furcilla Martin, 1975 [Diptera] and Furcilla Bakharev, 1988 [Ostracoda]; Ticofurcilla is a replacement name)
Furcilla tica Espinosa & Ortea, 2000: synonym of Ticofurcilla tica (Espinosa & Ortea, 2000)

Plesiocystiscinae
 Plesiocystiscus Coovert & Coovert, 1995

Abbreviations:
 (M) - original designation by monotype  
 OD -  original designation  
 OD (M) - original designation as type species, but also monotypic 
 SD - subsequent designation as type
 SD (M) - subsequent designation as type species, but also monotypic
 T - original designation by tautonomy

Comparisons of shells of the genera:

References 

 Carpenter P. P. (1857) (1855-1857). Catalogue of the collection of Mazatlan shells in the British Museum collected by Frederick Reigen. London:xvi+552 pp. (July 1855 - June 1857, each part dated at foot of first page)
 Espinosa J & Ortea J. (2000). "Descripción de un género y once especies nuevas de Cystiscidae y Marginellidae (Mollusca: Neogastropoda) del Caribe de Costa Rica". Aviccenia (12/13): 95-114.
 Espinosa J & Ortea J. (2002). "Nuevas especies de margineliformes de Cuba, Bahamas y el Mar Caribe de Costa Rica". Avicennia 15: 101-128.
 Gould A. A. (1860). "Descriptions of shells collected in the North Pacific Exploring Expedition under Captains Ringold and Rogers. One part." Proceedings Boston Society Natural History 7: 382-385.
 Laseron C. F. (1957). "A new classification of the Australian Marginellidae (Mollusca), with a review of species from the Solanderian and Dampierian zoogeographical provinces". Australian Journal of Marine and Freshwater Research 8(3): 274-311.
 Nevill G. & Nevill H. (1874). "Descriptions of new Mollusca from the Indian Ocean". Journal Asiatic Society of Bengal Vol. XLIII, Part II.
 Ortea J. & Espinosa J. (2001). "Intelcystiscus e Inbiocystiscus (Mollusca: Neogastrópoda: Cystiscidae) dos nuevos géneros del Atlántico occidental tropical". Avicennia 14: 107-114.
 Smiriglio C. & Mariottini P. (2001). "Description of Paolaura gen. nov. and of three new species of Cystiscidae from the Indian Ocean". La Conchiglia 299: 11-17.
 Shumacher C. F. (1817). Essai d´un nouveau système des habitations des vers testacés. Copenhagen, iv+287 pp., 22 plts.
 Swainson W. (1840). A treatise on malacology, or the natural classification of shells and shellfish. London, pp. 1–419, text figs. (Marginellidae: 323-324 in part 2)

External links 

 The Academy of Natural Sciences. A Database of Western Atlantic Marine Mollusca
  Family  Cystiscidae

 
Gastropod families
Taxa named by William Stimpson
Volutoidea